Charles Tottenham (19 April 1743 – 13 June 1823) was an Irish Member of Parliament.

Biography
Tottenham sat in the Irish House of Commons for New Ross from 1768 until 1 December 1800, when he resigned to allow Robert Leigh to become the sole member for New Ross in the new Parliament of the United Kingdom.

He was son of Charles Tottenham, father of Charles Tottenham, grandfather of Charles Tottenham, brother of Nicholas Loftus Tottenham and Ponsonby Tottenham, grandson of Charles Tottenham and Nicholas Loftus, 1st Viscount Loftus, nephew of Sir John Tottenham, 1st Baronet, Nicholas Loftus-Hume, 1st Earl of Ely and Henry Loftus, 1st Earl of Ely, and first cousin of Nicholas Loftus-Hume, 2nd Earl of Ely and Charles Loftus, 1st Marquess of Ely.

References
 http://www.stirnet.com/HTML/genie/british/tt/tottenham1.htm
 https://web.archive.org/web/20090601105535/http://www.leighrayment.com/commons/irelandcommons.htm
 http://www.stirnet.com/HTML/genie/british/ll/loftus01.htm

1743 births
1823 deaths
18th-century Anglo-Irish people
Irish MPs 1769–1776
Irish MPs 1776–1783
Irish MPs 1783–1790
Irish MPs 1790–1797
Irish MPs 1798–1800
Members of the Parliament of Ireland (pre-1801) for County Wexford constituencies